The World Naked Bike Ride (WNBR) is an international clothing-optional bike ride in which participants plan, meet and ride together en masse on human-powered transport (the vast majority on bicycles, but some on skateboards and inline skates), to "deliver a vision of a cleaner, safer, body-positive world." The first ride happened in Zaragoza (Spain) in 2001.

The dress code motto is "bare as you dare".

History

In 2003, Conrad Schmidt conceived the World Naked Bike Ride after organizing the Naked Bike Rides of the group Artists for Peace/Artists Against War (AFP/AAW). Initially, the message of the WNBR was protesting against oil dependency and celebrating the power and individuality of the human body. In 2006, there was a shift towards simplifying the message and focusing on cycling advocacy. 

The 2004 WNBR saw events in 28 cities, in ten countries on four continents. By 2010, WNBR had expanded to stage rides in 74 cities, in 17 countries, from the United States to the United Kingdom and Hungary to Paraguay.

Two male riders were arrested during the 2005 WNBR in North Conway, New Hampshire, and charged with "indecent exposure and lewdness". The two riders agreed to having the charges reduced to "disorderly conduct" and paid a $300 fine, the majority of which was paid for by the WNBR Legal Defense Fund. Six male riders were charged with public indecency during the 2005 WNBR Chicago ride and later prosecuted with sentences ranging from fines and non-expungeable conviction to three months of court supervision. In 2007, during the first World Naked Bike ride in Denver, Colorado police surrounded the bike riders and wrote several people tickets. During the WNBR held on June 12, 2010, two males were arrested by campus police at Western Washington University in Bellingham, Washington.

Simon Oosterman, the organizer of the 2005 WNBR in Auckland, and the first to be arrested during a WNBR event, is credited with going further and refocusing on the issue on moving away from fossil fuel dependency in the context of climate change. He urged: "Stop the indecent exposure to vehicle emissions."

The largest WNBR event is held in Portland OR. with over 10,000 participants.

Films
"World Naked Bike Ride Thessaloniki Greece" (Βγήκαμε από τα Ρούχα Μας; 27' Greece, 2009) Greek language with English subtitles, won the Audience Award at 11th Thessaloniki Documentary Festival 2009
"World Naked Bike Ride: The Documentary" (Toronto) 4 minute short
World Naked Bike Ride (31 minutes, UK, 2006) directed by Johnny Zapatos of High Altitude Films, narrated by Jon Snow
Indecent Exposure to Cars: The Story of the World Naked Bike Ride, produced by Conrad Schmidt 
Bare As You Dare: Portland's World Naked Bike Ride (Portland, OR) Directed by Ian McCluskey

See also

Bohemianism
 Counterculture
 Clothing-optional bike ride
Critical Mass
Culture jamming
 Direct action
 Flash mob
 Smart mob
 Outline of cycling
List of places where social nudity is practised
List of nude events
List of clothing-free events
Naked Pumpkin Run
Nakukymppi
Naturism
Nude beach and nudity in sport
Nude recreation
Public nudity
Reclaim the Streets
Soft energy path
Utility cycling
World Carfree Network

References
Notes

Further reading
Sustainability and Cities: Overcoming Automobile Dependence (Paperback) by Peter Newman, Jeffrey Kenworthy (Island Press, February 1999) 
The Offense of Public Nudity by Mark Storey
The World Naked Bike Ride Book by Richard Foley

External links

World Naked Bike Ride official site – general information and other resources
Biking Revolution News Toolbar News about World Naked Bike Ride, Critical Mass, & Super Hero Service Rides.

February events
June events
March events
Naked cycling events
Nudity and protest
Recurring events established in 2004